Gloria Chan may mean or refer to:

 Chan Hok-yan, former Hong Kong athlete
 Gloria Chan, former member of music group Cookies